Mariarosaria Taddeo is a senior research fellow at the Oxford Internet Institute, part of the University of Oxford, and deputy director of the Digital Ethics Lab. Taddeo is also an associate scholar at Said Business School, University of Oxford.

Education
Taddeo holds a PhD in philosophy from the University of Padua.  Prior to joining the Oxford Internet Institute, she was research fellow in cybersecurity and ethics at the University of Warwick (2014). She has also held a Marie Curie Fellowship at the University of Hertfordshire, exploring information warfare and its ethical implications.

Career 
Taddeo is the principal investigator on projects relating to ethics, digital technologies and artificial intelligence (AI), in particular the ethical challenges of the use of AI for national defence, socially good uses of AI, and how AI can advance the United Nation's Sustainable Development Goals. She is also a Defence, Security and Technology Dtsl Ethics Fellow of the Alan Turing Institute. In her work at the Turing Institute, she is the Principal Investigator for a two-year project focusing on the ethical implications of the use of data science and AI for national security and defence.  Taddeo is also a member of the Exploratory Team on Operational Ethics, part of the Human Factors and Medicine (HFM) panel of the NATO Science and Technology Organisation.

Recognition 
In 2018, ORBIT listed Taddeo among the top 100 experts working on AI in the world. In 2013 she was awarded the World Technology Award for Ethics, acknowledging her research on the ethics of cyber conflicts.  In 2010 she received The Simon Awards for Outstanding Research in Computing and Philosophy.

Published works 
Taddeo has published two books.
The Responsibilities of Online Service Providers, (2016) (2016) explores the responsibility of online service providers in contemporary societies, examining the complexity and global dimensions of the rapidly evolving challenges posed by the development of internet services.  
The Ethics of Information Warfare (2014), examines the ethical problems posed by information warfare and the different methods and approaches used to solve them.

Taddeo's research work co-authored with Professor Luciano Floridi on ethics and cyberwarfare, exploring the need for the regulation of artificial intelligence and cybersecurity has been published in Nature Her work on data philanthropy and individual rights was published in Minds and Machines, and work on the ethics of online service providers has been published in Science and Engineering Ethics.  Taddeo has also published research into cyber conflicts and political paper, published by Minds and Machines.  Other notable work on AI and security includes her paper published in Nature Machine Intelligence, co-authored with Tom McCutcheon and Luciano Floridi, describing the risks of trusting AI for national security and defence.  The paper makes recommendations for how AI can be part of the solution for a less risky approach.  Taddeo's and her co-authors body of work has been presented at the European Parliament's Subcommittee on Security and Defence.

Media 
Taddeo has been quoted in the media providing expert comment on ethics, AI and cybersecurity, with recent articles by the Financial Times talking about bias in AI and the Guardian interviewed on the need for public services to exercise care when using chatbots.  She has also been interviewed by news channels, giving her opinions on AI and cyberwarfare, such as appearing as a guest on Al Jazeera programme, Inside Story

References 

Year of birth missing (living people)
Living people
Artificial intelligence ethicists
Artificial intelligence researchers
University of Padua alumni
Philosophers of technology